Drew Hickey (born in Sydney) is a former Australian Rugby Union player who played blindside flanker and Number 8.
In February 2008 he moved to Japan to play for Kubota Spears in Japan's Top League
Hickey joined Worcester Warriors in the Summer of 2003 and was an integral part of propelling the team into the Guinness Premiership in 2004.
He formerly played for Orrell R.U.F.C., the New South Wales Waratahs and club side Sydney University.

Hickey has also notably played for Australian under 19s, Australian 21s and Australian sevens.

Post professional rugby Hickey is now coaching 2nd grade Sydney University Football Club and works as a Financial Advisor.

References

External links
 Worcester Warriors Player Profile
 Sydney University 2nd Grade Coaching Staff and Team members

Living people
Australian rugby union players
New South Wales Waratahs players
Australian expatriate rugby union players
Expatriate rugby union players in England
Expatriate rugby union players in Japan
Australian expatriate sportspeople in England
Australian expatriate sportspeople in Japan
Worcester Warriors players
Kubota Spears Funabashi Tokyo Bay players
Year of birth missing (living people)
Rugby union players from Sydney
Rugby union number eights